Stations of the Cross is a series of images depicting Jesus Christ on the day of his crucifixion. It can also refer to:

Stations of the Cross (album), an album by Johnny Thunders 
Stations of the Cross (film), a 2014 German film
The Station of the Cross, a radio network